Cogdill is a surname. Notable people with the surname include:

Dave Cogdill (1950–2017), American politician
Gail Cogdill (1937–2016), American football player
Michael Cogdill (born 1961), American journalist, novelist, screenwriter, and film producer

See also
Cordill